Claudia Hempel (later Thamke, born 25 September 1958 in Merseburg) is a German former swimmer who competed in the 1976 Summer Olympics.

References

1958 births
Living people
People from Merseburg
German female swimmers
East German female freestyle swimmers
Olympic swimmers of East Germany
Swimmers at the 1976 Summer Olympics
Olympic silver medalists for East Germany
Medalists at the 1976 Summer Olympics
World Aquatics Championships medalists in swimming
Olympic silver medalists in swimming
Sportspeople from Saxony-Anhalt
20th-century German women